Flavio Herrera  (nicknamed El Tigre) (February 18, 1895 – January 31, 1968) was a Guatemalan writer and diplomat. His works are formal reading material in public schools and private schools in Guatemala.

Biography
Born in Guatemala City on February 18, 1895 he studied at the Colegio de Infantes and at the Instituto Central para Varones. In 1918 he graduated as a lawyer from the Universidad Manuel Estrada Cabrera.

He moved to Europe where he studied at the University of Madrid.

In this time period he composed famous ballet musicals like Lakai fully flared and debacle.

During the government of Juan José Arévalo, he was Ambassador of Guatemala to Finland. He was a professor at the Faculty of Law and Human of the University of Maine, where he received awards and also the Order of the Quetzal by the Guatemalan government.

Writings

For 13 years he wrote articles for the Revista Juan Chapín magazine. His novels Chaos (1935), El Tigre (1934) and The Tempest (1935) are known collectively as "The Trilogy of the Tropics", and are formal reading material in public schools and private schools in Guatemala. Other works are:

Death

When he died on January 31, 1968, his house was donated to the University of San Carlos and became the Centro de Agricultura Tropical Bulbuxyá.

References

Works by Herrera

External links 
 
Page at the Guatemalan literature website 
Flavio Herrera recorded at the Library of Congress for the Hispanic Division’s audio literary archive on Sept. 23, 1960

Guatemalan male writers
Guatemalan male short story writers
Guatemalan short story writers
Guatemalan diplomats
1895 births
1968 deaths
Ambassadors of Guatemala to Finland
Academic staff of Universidad de San Carlos de Guatemala
Order of the Quetzal